Hajji Kola (also Romanized as Ḩājjī Kolā, Ḩājī Kalā, and Ḩājjī Kalā; also known as Ḩājjī Kūlā) is a village in Garmab Rural District, Chahardangeh District, Sari County, Mazandaran Province, Iran. At the 2006 census, its population was 179, in 44 families.

References 

Populated places in Sari County